A list of films produced in the United Kingdom in 1981 (see 1981 in film):

1981

See also
1981 in British music
1981 in British radio
1981 in British television
1981 in the United Kingdom

References

External links

1981
Films
Lists of 1981 films by country or language